Bill Doherty Jr. is an American actor.

Personal life
Bill Doherty Jr. was born and raised in Dedham, Massachusetts. After high school, Doherty became a deadhead, following the Grateful Dead around the country, mostly by hitchhiking, for five years.

Career
Since 2005 Doherty starred in independent short and feature films throughout New England and New York. He appeared in television shows including Showtime's Brotherhood and ABC's Body of Proof. He also wrote, directed and starred in the short film Love Hurts which made its world premiere at the Boston International Film Festival.

He made the move to Los Angeles in 2011 and has since worked with writer/director Billy Van Zandt on his farce Drop Dead!, director/acting coach Larry Moss on the Los Angeles premiere of Neil LaBute's play In a Dark Dark House, actor/director Ronnie Marmo and actor/writer Jon Polito on the world premiere play 86'd, actors Kevin Chamberlin, Eric Kramer, and Omar Benson Miller on the short film Meat and Potatoes, and had three roles in the animated feature film Icky: An American dog story starring Dan Lauria, Jonathan Silverman, Meredith Salenger, and Jennifer Finnigan.

Drop Dead!
In 2014 Bill Doherty Jr. performed one of his most notable roles playing the lead role of Brent Reynolds as Alexander Barrington. An eccentric, larger than life, washed up method actor trying to make a career comeback in an off off off off off off off broadway show in the farce/comedy Drop Dead! written and directed by Billy Van Zandt. Los Angeles raved about the 23 year comeback of the play.

Personal Recognitions for Drop Dead!:
 L.A. Weekly: "There are some very funny moments of timeless physical comedy, such as how the show's leading man (the excellent Bill Doherty Jr.) gets his nose broken, and in the playwright's "My life is over" opening-night speech."
 Broadway World: "DROP DEAD! lead actor Alexander is played by Brent Reynolds (Bill Doherty Jr.) in a lavender waistcoat worthy of any Shakespearean role."
 All About the Stage: "Alexander Barrington (the hysterical Bill Doherty Jr.) performs several hysterical soliloquies about snow."
 The Hollywood Times: "Bill Doherty Jr. let us all know, "He is the MAN!""
 Life in L.A.: "Bill Doherty Jr. plays Brent Reynolds humorously, and it is delightful to watch him play the character with such lighthearted charm."
 Tolucan Times: "As a passionate and offbeat newly married couple, Shelly Hacco and Bill Doherty Jr. as her dim-witted hubby who can't remember her name... are a TON OF FUN!"

In a Dark Dark House
In 2014 Bill Doherty Jr. dove directly from Drop Dead! into the supporting role of Drew in the Los Angeles premiere of Neil LaBute's play In a Dark Dark House. He understudied the supporting role. The play was directed by Larry Moss and Doherty had one sole performance was at the Matrix theater in Los Angeles on Wednesday August 27, 2014.

86'd
In 2012 Bill was cast in the world premiere play 86'd written by Jon Polito. The play was directed by Ronnie Marmo and was chosen as L.A. Weeklys weekly pick and L.A. Times critics choice.

Personal recognitions for 86'd:
 L.A. Times (Critic's Choice review): "Mark Vasquez and Bill Doherty Jr. are late-inning punks worth the show."
 Backstage (Los Angeles) review: "Mark Vasquez and Bill Doherty Jr. have some priceless moments as a pair of punk thugs."

Theater credits

References

External links

 
Bill Doherty Jr. at "About the Artists"
Bill Doherty Jr. at "Broadwayworld.com"

American male film actors
American male stage actors
American male television actors
Living people
People from Dedham, Massachusetts
Year of birth missing (living people)